is a Japanese football player. He plays for FC Kariya.

Playing career
Takuma Kuroda joined to Renofa Yamaguchi FC in August 2014. In 2016, he moved to FC Kariya.

References

External links

1992 births
Living people
Ryutsu Keizai University alumni
Association football people from Osaka Prefecture
Japanese footballers
J3 League players
Japan Football League players
Renofa Yamaguchi FC players
FC Kariya players
People from Higashiōsaka
Association football midfielders